Q3 or Q-3 may refer to:

Transportation 
 Zambian Airways, IATA airline code Q3
 Audi Q3, a subcompact luxury crossover SUV produced from 2011
 Q3 (New York City bus), a bus line in New York City
 QuayCity Q3, a bus in Newcastle, UK

Other 
 The third quarter of a fiscal year
 The third quarter of a calendar year
 The third quartile, in descriptive statistics
 The third quarto edition of William Shakespeare's Titus Andronicus
 Quake III Arena, a 1999 multi-platform video game
 Haplogroup Q3 (Y-DNA), a Y-chromosome DNA haplogroup
 Q3, a field of p-adic numbers in mathematics
 Q3 was a British Puppetry company that produced the models used in Fingerbobs
 Q3, a production duo consisting of Jabari Manwa and Isaiah "Kiko Merley" Merriweather from Brockhampton (band)
Quran 3,  the 3rd chapter of the Islamic Holy book
Q3 Academy (disambiguation)

See also
3Q (disambiguation)